Thunder and Lightning may refer to:

The physical phenomena thunder and lightning
Thunder and Lightning (album), a 1983 album by Thin Lizzy
 Thunder and Lightning (1938 film), a Swedish film
Thunder and Lightning (1977 film), an American film starring David Carradine and Kate Jackson
Thunder and Lightning (comics), comic book characters
Thunder (comics) and Lightning (DC Comics), comic book characters
Thunder and Lightning (professional wrestling), professional wrestling team
"Thunder and Lightning" (Vukašin Brajić song), 2010
"Thunder and Lightning", a 1980 song by Chicago from the album Chicago XIV
"Thunder and Lightning (Chi Coltrane song)", 1972
"Thunder and Lightning", a song by Phil Collins from his 1981 album Face Value
"Thunder & Lightning", a song by Motörhead from the 2015 album Bad Magic
"Thunder and Lightning", a song by Lee "Scratch" Perry and Mad Professor from the 1995 album Super Ape Inna Jungle
Thunder & Lightning (video game), a 1990 video game published by Romstar
"Thunder and Lightning", a variation on Cream  tea
"Donner and Blitzen" (English: Thunder and Lightning), two of Santa Claus's reindeer
 Thunder and Lightning, two teams in the Rachael Heyhoe-Flint Trophy

See also 
Thunder Meets Lightning - a 1990 boxing fight between Julio Cesar Chavez and Meldrick Taylor